is a passenger railway station located in the city of Maizuru, Kyoto Prefecture, Japan, operated by West Japan Railway Company (JR West).

Lines 

Layout
The station consists of a single side platform serving one bi-directional track. The station is unattended. The station building was transferred from JR West to Maizuru City on March 31, 2008, and after 14 million yen in renovations it opened in 2009 as the "Maizuru City Matsuodera Ekimae Tourism Exchange Facility" The station building was designated a  Registered Tangible Cultural Property in 2018.

Adjacent stations

History 
The station was opened on December 20, 1922

Passenger statistics
In fiscal 2018, the station was used by an average of 47 passengers daily.

Surrounding area
 Matsuo-dera 
Maizuru Industrial College of Technology

See also
 List of railway stations in Japan

References

External links

  

Railway stations in Kyoto Prefecture
Railway stations in Japan opened in 1922
Registered Tangible Cultural Properties
Maizuru